Lynell Hamilton (born August 5, 1985) is a former American football running back who has most recently worked as a graduate assistant at San Diego State University. He was signed by the New Orleans Saints as an undrafted free agent in 2008. He played college football at San Diego State.

Early career
Hamilton attended Edison High School in Stockton, where he was ranked as one of the country's top running back prospects.

College career
In 2003, Hamilton had an outstanding freshman year at San Diego State, rushing for 1,087 yards in 10 games. He was named Mountain West Conference Freshman of the Year.  He suffered a severe ankle and leg injury in the tenth game of the season, and sat out the following year. As a redshirt sophomore in 2005, he led the Aztecs in rushing with 819 yards and 9 touchdowns.  The rest of his career was hampered by knee injuries, and he had only 56 carries for 146 yards during his last two years.  For his college career, Hamilton had 480 carries for 2,052 yards and 14 rushing touchdowns, and 57 passes caught for 360 yards and 3 touchdowns.

Professional career
Hamilton was on the New Orleans Saints practice squad for most of 2008, and played in only three games.  In 2009 he served as the fourth running back for the Saints behind Pierre Thomas, Reggie Bush, and Mike Bell.  He finished the regular season with a total of 125 rushing yards and 2 touchdowns; he also scored a touchdown in the Saints' first playoff game on their way to winning Super Bowl XLIV.  He was expected to fill a more important role in 2010, but on August 11, 2010, during a preseason joint practice session with the New England Patriots, he suffered a knee injury (later confirmed to be an ACL tear) that was expected to end Hamilton's season. He was "waived/injured" by the Saints on August 14, and after clearing waivers he was placed on the injured reserve list on August 16.  He was waived on August 4, 2011 during training camp.

After his playing career ended, he returned to San Diego State as a graduate assistant.

References

External links
New Orleans Saints bio
San Diego State Aztecs bio

1985 births
Living people
Players of American football from Stockton, California
American football running backs
San Diego State Aztecs football players
New Orleans Saints players